Jimmy Vienot (born June 9, 1995) is a French Muay Thai kickboxer who is the reigning SUPERKOMBAT World Middleweight Champion. He is a former Lumpinee Stadium and Arena Fight champion. As of October 27, 2022, he is ranked #3 in the ONE Featherweight Muay Thai rankings.

Biography and career

Early career
Jimmy started Muay Thai at 13 years old in the Star Boxing gym of Montpellier, the city where he grew up since the age of 10. He chose Muay Thai after quitting Judo which lacked intensity to his taste.
In 2012 and 2013 Jimmy became European champion in amateur competitions and established himself as one of the most promising French fighter. 
He should have competed in the IFMA 2014 World Championship but his trip wasn't funded because his gym didn't match the federation requirements.

Vienot made his professional debut during the summer of 2013 in Thailand and then in France in September where he showed he was already a force to be reckoned at 18 years old by winning a one night tournament.
A month later Jimmy engaged himself in the Fight tournament and was eliminated in the semi-final by Ruslan Kushnirenko in a controversial decision.
Three weeks later Vienot fought for his first world title against Singmanee Kaewsamrit, he lost by decision.

After racking up wins on the French scene against top fighters like Rafi Bohic and Gaetan Dambo, Jimmy entered the July 2017 Toyota Marathon tournament where he faced thai legend Petchboonchu FA Group in the semi-final. He lost the fight but was very happy with the experience he gained.

Jimmy was eliminated in the first round of the 2014 IFMA European Championship by Itay Gershon. He was asked to be in a super fight for the closing ceremony of the event, he lost a decision to hometown fighter Oskar Stazska.

On November 15 Jimmy suffered the first and only knockout loss of his career when he faced thai champion Pakorn PKSaenchaimuaythaigym in the Topking World Series event. Pakorn landed a left hook that made Jimmy faceplant in the first round.

After losing to Bobo Sacko in a fight at the top of the French scene, Jimmy had a 17-3 record during 2015 and 2016. Only losing to Thai champions Chanajon and twice to top fighter Yodwicha Por Boonsit. His last fight of 2016 saw him win his first world title when he knocked out Brazilian champion Jose Neto in the second round with an elbow. Two months later Vienot won his second world title, the WBC belt against Denpanom Kirakorat at the legendary Rajadamnern Stadium.

GLORY
During 2017-2018 Vienot continued his ascension in Muay Thai winning the All Star Muay Thai one night tournament and winning a third world title against thai champion Sorgraw Petchyindee in late 2018. He also went back to amateur competition and won the IFMA European title. Vienot diversified himself during that time taking fights in kickboxing rules against top fighters like Mohamed Hendouf, Wilson Varela and signing with Glory kickboxing to face champion and title challenger Cedric Doumbe and Alim Nabiev.

Muay Thai
In April 2019 Vienot became the fourth non thai fighter to win the Lumpinee Stadium title, beating Talaytong Sor.Thanaphet by decision. Following that win Vienot had his biggest kickboxing rules success yet a month later by beating Vedat Hoduk for the newly created Arena Fight title.

In August 2019 Vienot won the IFMA World championship and received the award for "Best athlete" of the competition.

Vienot faced Yodwicha Banchamek for the vacant WMC Middleweight Championship at Empire Fight: Vikings Edition on October 2, 2021. He won by decision.

SUPERKOMBAT
In the fall of 2021, Vienot signed with the Superkombat Fighting Championship. He made his promotional debut at Superkombat Universe on November 1, 2021, against Arman Ambaryan for the world middleweight title. He won the fight by unanimous decision.

ONE Championship 
Vienot made his ONE Championship debut at ONE 157 on May 20, 2022, where he faced Petchmorakot Petchyindee Academy for the ONE Featherweight Muay Thai World Championship. He lost the fight by split decision.

Vienot faced Niclas Larsen at ONE 162 on October 21, 2022. He won the fight by unanimous decision.

Mixed martial arts career
Vienot made his mixed martial arts debut on September 3, 2021 at UAE Warriors 22 against Daniel Donchenko. He won the fight by decision.

ARES Fightings Championship
On March 1, 2023, it was announced that Vienot had signed with ARES Fighting Championship and he make promotional debut on May 11, 2023.

Titles and accomplishments

Amateur

World Muaythai Federation
 2012 WMF European Junior -67 kg Champion

International Federation of Muaythai Associations
 2013 IFMA European Championships Junior -71 kg 
 2018 IFMA European Championships -75 kg 
 2018 IFMA European Championship Best Athlete
 2019 IFMA World Championships -75 kg 
 2019 IFMA World Championship Best Athlete
 2019 IFMA European Championships -75 kg 
 2021 IFMA World Championships -71kg

Professional
 2014 France Muay Thai Champion
World Professional Muaythai Federation
 2016 WPMF World -72.5 kg Champion

World Boxing Council Muay Thai
 2017 WBC Muay Thai World -72.5 kg Champion

World Muay Thai Council
 2018 WMC World -160 lbs Champion (two defenses)
 2021 WMC World -154 lbs Champion

Lumpinee Stadium
 2019 Lumpinee Stadium 160 lbs Champion

Arena Fight
 2019 Arena Fight K-1 -75 kg Champion

Superkombat Fighting Championship
 2021 Superkombat World -70 kg Champion

Kickboxing and Muay Thai record

|-  style="background:#fbb;"
|  2023-03-18 || Loss || align="left" | Youssef Assouik || Nice Fight Night 10 || Nice, France || Decision (unanimous) || 5 || 3:00 
|-
! style=background:white colspan=9 |
|-  style="background:#cfc;"
| 2022-10-21 || Win ||align=left| Niclas Larsen  || ONE 162 || Kuala Lumpur, Malaysia || Decision (unanimous) || 3 || 3:00  
|-  style="background:#fbb;"
| 2022-05-20|| Loss ||align=left| Petchmorakot Petchyindee Academy ||  ONE 157 || Kallang, Singapore || Decision (split) || 5 || 3:00
|-
! style=background:white colspan=9 |
|-  style="background:#cfc;"
|  2021-11-01 || Win || align="left" | Arman Hambaryan || Superkombat Universe || Dubai, UAE || Decision (unanimous) || 5 || 3:00
|-
! style=background:white colspan=9 |

|-  style="background:#cfc;"
|  2021-10-02 || Win || align="left" | Yodwicha Banchamek || Empire Fight - Vikings Edition || Montbéliard, France || Decision (Split)|| 5 || 3:00
|-
! style=background:white colspan=9 |

|-  style="background:#cfc;"
| 2020-03-07 || Win||align=left| Saro Presti|| Nice Fight Night|| Nice, France || TKO (Corner stoppage)|| 3 ||
|-  style="background:#cfc;"
| 2020-02-08 || Win||align=left| Chanajon P.K. Saenchai Muaythaigym|| Empire Fight || France || Decision || 5 || 3:00
|-
! style=background:white colspan=9 |
|-  style="background:#fbb;"
| 2019-09-25 || Loss||align=left| Sorgraw Petchyindee ||  Lumpinee Stadium  || Bangkok, Thailand || Decision  || 5 ||  3:00
|-
! style=background:white colspan=9 |
|-  style="background:#cfc;"
| 2019-06-08 || Win ||align=left| Vedat Hoduk || Arena Fight || Aix en Provence, France || Decision || 5 || 3:00
|-
! style=background:white colspan=9 |
|-  style="background:#cfc;"
| 2019-04-30 || Win ||align=left| Talaytong Sor.Thanaphet || Lumpinee Stadium || Bangkok, Thailand || Decision || 5 || 3:00
|-
! style=background:white colspan=9 |
|-  style="background:#cfc;"
| 2019-02-20 || Win ||align=left| Dabmoon Sia Chot Bangsean || All Star Muay Thai || Paris, France || KO || 1 ||
|-  style="background:#c5d2ea;"
| 2018-12-01 || NC ||align=left| Ilya Grad || Credissimo Golden Fight  || France || No Contest (doctor stoppage) || 1 ||  
|-
! style=background:white colspan=9 |
|-  style="background:#fbb;"
| 2018-10-20 || Loss||align=left| Cedric Doumbe|| Glory 60: Lyon  || Lyon, France || Decision (Unanimous) || 3 ||  3:00
|-  style="background:#cfc;"
| 2018-09-22 || Win ||align=left| Wilson Varela || Le Trophée Des Etoiles, Final || Aix en Provence, France || Decision || 3 || 3:00
|-  style="background:#cfc;"
| 2018-09-22 || Win ||align=left| Ivan Naccari || Le Trophée Des Etoiles, Semi Final || Aix en Provence, France || Decision || 3 || 3:00
|-  style="background:#cfc;"
| 2018-08-23 || Win||align=left| Sorgraw Petchyindee || Best Of Siam XIII Rajadamnern Stadium  || Bangkok, Thailand || Decision (Split) || 5 ||  3:00
|-
! style=background:white colspan=9 |
|-  style="background:#cfc;"
| 2018-05-05 || Win||align=left| Noppakao Sor Sirliluck || Capital Fights 3  || Paris, France || KO || 2 ||
|-  bgcolor="#fbb"
| 2018-03-03 || Loss ||align=left| Eyevan Danenberg || Glory 51: Rotterdam  || Utrecht, Netherlands || Decision (Split) || 3 || 3:00
|-  style="background:#cfc;"
| 2018-02-01 || Win||align=left| Edye Ruiz || All Star Muay-Thai, Final  || Paris, France || Decision || 3 || 3:00
|-  style="background:#cfc;"
| 2018-02-01 || Win||align=left| Adelino Boa Morte || All Star Muay-Thai, Semi Final  || Paris, France || Decision || 3 || 3:00
|-  style="background:#cfc;"
| 2018-01-06 || Win||align=left| Serginio Kanters || Kerner Thai  || Paris, France || Decision || 5 || 3:00
|-  style="background:#fbb;"
| 2017-11-17 || Loss ||align=left| Hamza Ngoto || Warriors Night  || Paris, France || Decision || 5 || 3:00
|-  style="background:#fbb"
| 2017-10-28 || Loss ||align=left| Alim Nabiev|| Glory 47: Lyon || Lyon, France || Decision (split) || 3 || 3:00
|-  style="background:#fbb"
| 2017-09-23 || Loss ||align=left| Mohamed Hendouf|| Extreme Fight For Heroes 5 || France || Decision || 3 || 3:00
|-  style="background:#fbb;"
| 2017-05-27 || Loss ||align=left| Chanajon P.K. Saenchai Muaythaigym || Warriors Night  || Paris, France || Decision || 5 || 3:00
|-  style="background:#fbb;"
| 2017-03-18 || Loss ||align=left| Rungrawee Kietpatharapan || La Nuit Des Titans  || Tours, France || Decision || 5 || 3:00
|-  style="background:#cfc;"
| 2017-02-23|| Win||align=left| Denpanom Kirakorat||Best Of Siam X Rajadamnern Stadium ||Bangkok, Thailand|| KO (Elbow) ||3 ||  
|-
! style=background:white colspan=9 |
|-  style="background:#cfc;"
| 2017-01-28|| Win||align=left| Sudsakorn Sor Klinmee ||Thai Boxe Mania 2017 || Italy ||Decision || 3 || 3:00
|-  style="background:#cfc;"
| 2016-12-04 || Win||align=left| Jose Neto || WPMF King's Birthday || Bangkok, Thailand || KO (Right Hook) || 2 || 
|-
! style=background:white colspan=9 |
|-  style="background:#cfc;"
| 2016-11-19 || Win||align=left| Hu Yafey || WLF Rise Of Heroes Switzerland || Switzerland || TKO (Forfeit) || 1 ||
|-  style="background:#cfc;"
| 2016-10-29 || Win||align=left| Tengnueng Sitjaesairoong || Best Of Siam IX || France || Decision || 5 || 3:00
|-  style="background:#CCFFCC;"
| 2016-10-08 || Win||align=left| Mustapha Yasar|| World GBC Tour 11|| France || KO || 1||
|-  style="background:#CCFFCC;"
| 2016-09-17 || Win||align=left| Yodpayak Sitsongpeenong|| Wicked One Duel|| Paris, France || Decision || 5|| 3:00
|-  style="background:#CCFFCC;"
| 2016-08-26 || Win||align=left| Gaetan Dambo|| Elite War Night|| France || Decision || 5|| 3:00
|-  style="background:#fbb;"
| 2016-06-11 || Loss||align=left| Yodwicha Por Boonsit || Warriors Night 5 || Paris, France || Decision || 5 || 3:00
|-  style="background:#CCFFCC;"
| 2016-04-30 || Win||align=left| Johane Beausejour|| Kerner Thai|| Paris, France || Decision || 5|| 3:00
|-  style="background:#CCFFCC;"
| 2016-03-26 || Win||align=left| Christian Zahe || Master Fight|| France || TKO || 3||
|-  style="background:#CCFFCC;"
| 2016-02-13 || Win||align=left| Mohamed Souane || La Nuit des Titans|| Tours, France || Decision || 5|| 3:00
|-  style="background:#CCFFCC;"
| 2016-02-13 || Win||align=left| Yazid Boussaha || Stars Night|| France || Decision || 5|| 3:00
|-  style="background:#fbb;"
| 2015-12-11 || Loss ||align=left| Chanajon P.K. Saenchai Muaythaigym || Best Of Siam 7  || Paris, France || Decision || 5 || 3:00
|-  style="background:#CCFFCC;"
| 2015-10-17 || Win||align=left| Nilmungkorn Sudsakorngym || Max Muay Thai || Pattaya, Thailand || KO (Right cross) || 2 || 0:15
|-  style="background:#CCFFCC;"
| 2015-10-17 || Win||align=left| Dmitry Varats || Topking World Series || China || Decision || 3|| 3:00
|-  style="background:#CCFFCC;"
| 2015-09-20 || Win||align=left| Nayanesh Ayman|| Topking World Series || Laos || Decision || 3|| 3:00
|-  style="background:#fbb;"
| 2015-08-04 || Win ||align=left| Yodwicha Por Boonsit || Fight Night Saint-Tropez  || Saint Tropez, France || Decision || 5 || 3:00
|-  style="background:#CCFFCC;"
| 2015-03-19 || Win||align=left| Guimba Coulibaly|| Best Of Siam 6|| Paris, France || TKO || 3||
|-  style="background:#CCFFCC;"
| 2015-05-23 || Win||align=left| Christophe Pruvost || Radikal Fight Night 3|| France || Decision || 5 || 3:00
|-  style="background:#CCFFCC;"
| 2015-04-04 || Win||align=left| Kaiss Najm || Lion Belt 5 || France || Decision || 5 || 3:00
|-  style="background:#CCFFCC;"
| 2015-03-07 || Win||align=left| Morgan Adrar || Ultimate Fight 2 || France || Decision || 5 || 3:00
|-  style="background:#fbb;"
| 2015-02-07 || Loss||align=left| Bobo Sacko || La Nuit des Titans, Semi Final || Tours, France || Decision || 3 || 3:00
|-  style="background:#fbb;"
| 2014-11-01 || Loss||align=left| Pakorn PKSaenchaimuaythaigym || Top King Muay Thai || Belarus || KO (Punch) || 1 ||
|-  style="background:#fbb;"
| 2014-10-23 || Loss||align=left| Abdallah Mabel || A1 WCC Lyon, Semi Finals  || Lyon, France || DQ (Ref. Stop./Three warning) ||   ||
|-  bgcolor="#FFBBBB"
| 2014-09-28 || Loss ||align=left| Oskar Staszka || 2014 IFMA European Championship, Closing Ceremony Super Fight|| Poland || Decision || 3 || 3:00
|-  bgcolor="#FFBBBB"
| 2014-09-07 || Loss ||align=left| Jingreedtong Seatransferry || Max Muay Thai|| Pattaya, Thailand || Decision || 5 || 3:00
|-  style="background:#CCFFCC;"
| 2014-08-20 || Win||align=left|  || MBK Fight Night || Bangkok, Thailand || KO || 1 ||
|-  style="background:#fbb;"
| 2014-07-25 || Loss||align=left| Petchboonchu FA Group || Toyota Marathon, Semi finals || Bangkok, Thailand || Decision || 3 || 3:00
|-  style="background:#CCFFCC;"
| 2014-07-25 || Loss||align=left| Dima Demakov || Toyota Marathon, Quarter finals || Bangkok, Thailand || Decision || 3 || 3:00
|-  style="background:#fbb;"
| 2014-06-27 || Loss||align=left| Gaetan Dambo || Les Arts du Respect, Semi Final || Nice, France || Decision  || 5 || 3:00
|-  bgcolor="#CCFFCC"
| 2014-06-07 || Win||align=left| Rafi Bohic || Gala du Phenix Muaythai 6 || France || Decision  || 5 || 3:00
|-  bgcolor="#CCFFCC"
| 2014-04-24 || Win||align=left| Lahoucine Idouche || Thai Boxing Showtime 5|| France || Decision || 3 || 3:00
|-  bgcolor="#fbb"
| 2014-04-19 || Loss||align=left| Mohamed Houmer || LFC#3|| France || Decision || 3 || 3:00
|-  bgcolor="#CCFFCC"
| 2014-04-12 || Win||align=left| Cédric Colombo || Championnat De France FMDA|| Paris, France || KO || 2 ||  
|-
! style=background:white colspan=9 |
|-  bgcolor="#CCFFCC"
| 2014-03-08 || Win||align=left| Mickael Francoise|| Le Choc des Légendes|| France || KO || 3 ||
|-  bgcolor="#CCFFCC"
| 2014-02-15 || Win||align=left| Christopher Wyckaert || WICKED ONE Tournament #4|| Paris, France || TKO || 2 ||
|-  bgcolor="#fbb"
| 2013-12-27 || Loss||align=left| Singmanee Kaewsamrit || Klongsarn|| Bangkok, Thailand || Decision || 5 || 3:00
|-
! style=background:white colspan=9 |
|-  bgcolor="#fbb"
| 2013-11-30 || Loss||align=left| Ruslan Kushnirenko|| THAI FIGHT 2013 - 1/2 Finals || Bangkok, Thailand || Decision || 3 || 3:00
|-  bgcolor="#CCFFCC"
| 2013-10-23 || Win||align=left| Adaylton Freitas|| THAI FIGHT 2013 - 1/4 Finals || Bangkok, Thailand || TKO ||  ||
|-  bgcolor="#CCFFCC"
| 2013-09-28 || Win||align=left| Michael Vieillard ||Thai Tournament 6, Final || Switzerland || Decision || 3 || 3:00
|-  bgcolor="#CCFFCC"
| 2013-09-28 || Win||align=left| Jamal Wahib ||Thai Tournament 6, Semi Final || Switzerland || Decision || 3 || 3:00
|-  bgcolor="#CCFFCC"
| 2013-07 || Win||align=left|  || || Bangkok, Thailand || KO (Low kick) ||  ||
|-
| colspan=9 | Legend:    

|-  style="background:#cfc;"
| 2021-12-11 ||Win ||align=left| Andrei Kulebin || 2021 IFMA World Championships, Final || Bangkok, Thailand || Decision (Unanimous)|| 3 ||
|-
! style=background:white colspan=9 |
|-  style="background:#cfc;"
| 2021-12-10 || Win||align=left| Thananchai Rachanon || 2021 IFMA World Championships, Semi Finals || Bangkok, Thailand || Decision || 3 ||
|-  style="background:#cfc;"
| 2021-12-09 || Win||align=left|  Mindaugas Narauskas || 2021 IFMA World Championships, Quarter Finals || Bangkok, Thailand || Decision || 3 ||
|-  style="background:#cfc;"
| 2021-12-09 || Win||align=left|  Henrik Koczo|| 2021 IFMA World Championships, Round 2 || Bangkok, Thailand || Decision || 3 ||

|-  bgcolor="#CCFFCC"
| 2019-11-10 || Win||align=left| Denis Kolotygin|| 2019 IFMA European Championship, Final|| Minsk, Belarus || Decision (Unanimous) || 3 || 3:00 
|-
! style=background:white colspan=9 |

|-  bgcolor="#CCFFCC"
| 2019-11-08 || Win||align=left| Vitaly Gurkov|| 2019 IFMA European Championship, Semi Finals|| Minsk, Belarus || Decision (Split) || 3 || 3:00 

|-  bgcolor="#CCFFCC"
| 2019-11-05 || Win||align=left| Nayanesh Parikh Bumba|| 2019 IFMA European Championship, Quarter Finals|| Minsk, Belarus || Decision || 3 || 3:00 

|-  bgcolor="#CCFFCC"
| 2019-07-28 || Win||align=left| Volodymyr Borishev || 2019 IFMA World Championship, Final|| Bangkok, Thailand || Decision || 3 || 3:00 
|-
! style=background:white colspan=9 |
|-  bgcolor="#CCFFCC"
| 2019-07-26 || Win||align=left| Nayanesh Parikh || 2019 IFMA World Championship, Semi Final|| Bangkok, Thailand || Decision || 3 || 3:00
|-  bgcolor="#CCFFCC"
| 2019-07-25 || Win||align=left| Enis Yunusoglu || 2019 IFMA World Championship, Quarter Final|| Bangkok, Thailand || Decision || 3 || 3:00
|-  bgcolor="#CCFFCC"
| 2019-07-24 || Win||align=left| Giovanni Mazzetti || 2019 IFMA World Championship, Second Round|| Bangkok, Thailand || KO (High Kick) || 3 ||
|-  bgcolor="#CCFFCC"
| 2019-07-23 || Win||align=left| Karl-Joonatan Kvell || 2019 IFMA World Championship, First Round|| Bangkok, Thailand || TKO (Knee) || 1 ||
|-  bgcolor="#CCFFCC"
| 2018-07-07 || Win||align=left| Vitaly Gurkov || 2018 IFMA European Championship, Final|| Czech Republic || Decision || 3 || 3:00 
|-
! style=background:white colspan=9 |
|-  bgcolor="#CCFFCC"
| 2018-07-04 || Win||align=left| Stanislav Perzhanovskyi || 2018 IFMA European Championship, Semi Final|| Czech Republic || Decision || 3 || 3:00

|-  bgcolor="#CCFFCC"
| 2018-07-02 || Win||align=left| Martynas Jasiunas  || 2018 IFMA European Championship, Quarter Finals|| Czech Republic || Decision || 3 || 3:00

|-  bgcolor="#CCFFCC"
| 2018-07-01 || Win||align=left| Christian Lochner || 2018 IFMA European Championship, 1/8 Finals|| Czech Republic || Decision || 3 || 3:00

|-  bgcolor="#FFBBBB"
| 2014-09-27 || Loss||align=left| Itay Gershon || 2014 IFMA European Championship, First Round|| Poland || Decision || 3 || 3:00
|-  bgcolor="#CCFFCC"
| 2014-01-26 || Win||align=left| Anthony Gazel || || France || Decision || 3 || 3:00
|-  bgcolor="#CCFFCC"
| 2013-07-28 || Win||align=left| Martynas Jasiunas || 2013 IFMA European Championship, Final|| Portugal || Decision || 3 || 3:00 
|-
! style=background:white colspan=9 |
|-  bgcolor="#CCFFCC"
| 2013-07-27 || Win||align=left| Krystof Mares || 2013 IFMA European Championship, Semi Final|| Portugal || KO (Low kick) || 3 ||
|-  bgcolor="#CCFFCC"
| 2013-05-25 || Win||align=left|  Kevin Llorens|| Final Fight|| Cèze, France || KO  ||  ||
|-  bgcolor="#CCFFCC"
| 2012-09 || Win||align=left| Terry Tucker || 2012 WMF European Championship|| Bulgaria || KO (High kick) ||  || 
|-
! style=background:white colspan=9 |
|-
| colspan=9 | Legend:

Mixed martial arts record

|-
|
|align=center|
|
|
|Ares FC 15
|
|align=center|
|align=center|
|Paris, France
|-
|Win
|align=center|1-0
|Daniel Donchenko
|Decision (Unanimous)
|UAE Warriors 22
|
|align=center|3
|align=center|3:00
|Abu Dhabi, United Arab Emirates

See also
List of male kickboxers

References

Living people
French male kickboxers
Welterweight kickboxers
French Muay Thai practitioners
1995 births
ONE Championship kickboxers 
Glory kickboxers
SUPERKOMBAT kickboxers
French male mixed martial artists
Mixed martial artists utilizing Muay Thai